Najd was a Palestinian Arab village, located  northeast of Gaza City. During the British Mandate in Palestine, children from Najd attended school in the nearby village of Simsim. On 13 May 1948, Najd was occupied by the Negev Brigade as part of Operation Barak, and the villagers were expelled.

Etymology
Palmer wrote that the name came of the village came from the word for "Highland", while Socin writes that the name comes from "Beautiful".

History
Ceramics from the Byzantine period have been found here.

Ottoman era
Najd was incorporated into the Ottoman Empire in 1517 with the rest of Palestine, and in the  1596 tax registers, the village, called Najd al-Garbi, was located in the  nahiya (subdistrict) of Gaza under the liwa' (district) of Gaza. It had a population of 39 Muslim household; an estimated   215 persons. The villagers  paid a fixed tax-rate of 33,3% on a number of crops, including wheat, barley and fruit, as well as on goats, beehives and vineyards; a total of 4,000 akçe.

Edward Robinson, who travelled through Palestine in 1838, noted that Najd lay south of a wadi, and described how the villagers were winnowing barley by throwing it into the air against the wind with  wooden forks.

In 1863 the French explorer Victor Guérin visited the village, describing it as being on a small height, and with three hundred inhabitants.  An Ottoman village list of about 1870 showed that Najd had  24 houses and a population of 56, though the population count included only men.

In 1883  the PEF's Survey of Western Palestine described  Najd as a small village with a well and a pond.

British mandate era
 
As the population grew during the Mandate period, the village expanded northwestward. The village population was Muslim, and the children attended school in Simsim,  to the northeast. The villagers worked primarily in agriculture and animal husbandry. Fields of grain and fruit trees surrounded Najd on all sides. The fruit trees were concentrated to the north and northeastern sides, where irrigation water was available from wells.

In the 1922 census of Palestine conducted by the British Mandate authorities, Nejd had a population of 305 inhabitants, all Muslims, while in  the 1931 census, Najd had 82 occupied houses and a population of 422 Muslims.

 

By the 1945 statistics  the population  was estimated to be 620, all Muslims with a total of 13,576 dunams of land.  Cultivated lands in the village in 1944-45 included a total of 10 dunums allocated for citrus and bananas and 11,916 dunums for cereals. An additional 511 dunums were irrigated or used for orchards, while 26 dunams were  built-up, urban, land.

1948 War and aftermath
According to Benny Morris, the villagers of Najd were expelled by soldiers from the Negev Brigade on 12–13 May, during the 1948 Arab–Israeli War.

Following the war the area was incorporated into the State of Israel and the city of Sderot was founded in 1951 on village land, a few miles to the south of the village site, while Or HaNer was founded in 1957 also on village land, to the northeast.

See also
Depopulated Palestinian locations in Israel

References

Bibliography

 
 
Glass, C.: "The Ordeals of Gaza", Lecture at the School of Oriental and African Studies (SOAS), London 22 Jan 09

External links
Welcome to Najd, palestineremembered.com
Najd, Zochrot
Survey of Western Palestine, Map 20:   IAA, Wikimedia commons 
Najd from the Khalil Sakakini Cultural Center

District of Gaza
Arab villages depopulated during the 1948 Arab–Israeli War